A gURLs wURLd, also known as Emma's Chatroom and Cyber Girls, is an Australian children's television series, co-produced by Screen Australia, Southern Star Entertainment, Southern Star Singapore, the Media Development Authority of Singapore, Norddeutscher Rundfunk, and TV Plus Production. It first aired on October 6, 2009, and in mcpom on October 9, 2009. There are 26 half-hour episodes in the series.

Premise
Three young teenage girls – a German, a Singaporean, and an Australian – become friends while studying together at school in Singapore. When two of them must return to their homes in Germany and Australia, they accidentally discover that their mobile phones and computers can combine to transport them into each other's houses.

Cast
 Marny Kennedy as Ally Henson
 Sophie Karbjinski as Emma Schubert
 Charlotte Nicdao as Jackie Lee
 Jannik Schümann as Nicholas
 Takaya Honda as Josh 
 Luke Erceg as Dan 
 Julie Wee as Michelle 
 Chervil Tan as Chelsea 
 Veracia Yong as Carla 
 Iris Lim as Sophie 
 Michael Lott as Jürgen 
 Christine Kutschera as Tina 
 Chew Kin Wah as Mr Lee 
 Bernie Chan as Mrs Lee 
 Catherine Sng as Jackie's Grandma 
 Clodagh Crowe as Sarah 
 Don Halbert as Ben 
 Sam Fraser as Damon

International broadcasts

References

External links
 
 A gURLs wURLd

2011 Australian television series debuts
2011 Australian television series endings
2011 Singaporean television series debuts
2011 Singaporean television series endings
2011 German television series debuts
2011 German television series endings
Australian children's television series
Nine Network original programming
English-language television shows
Television series by Endemol Australia
Okto shows
Television series about teenagers